Norah Lillian Penston (20 August 1903 – 1 February 1974) was a British botanist and academic administrator. She was principal of Bedford College, University of London, from 1951 to 1964.

Early life and education
Nora Penston was the daughter of A. J. Penston. She was educated at the Bolton School and St Anne's College, Oxford where she obtained a BA in botany in 
1927. She studied under W. O. James, researching the potassium nutrition of potatoes for her DPhil, which she gained in 1930.

Career
Penston was demonstrator in Botany at Oxford in 1928–29. She then moved to King's College London, where she was assistant lecturer from 1933 to 1936 and lecturer from 1936 to 1945. From 1940 to 1944 she served as acting head of Botany at King's College. In 1945 she became the first woman to be vice-principal of Wye College, part of the University of London, following its amalgamation with Swanley Horticultural College. She was also head of biological sciences department at Wye from 1947 to 1951. Appointed Principal of Bedford College in 1951, she remained there until her retirement in 1964.

She was unmarried.

References

1903 births
1974 deaths
Women botanists
Academics of King's College London
Alumni of St Anne's College, Oxford
People associated with Bedford College, London
People educated at Bolton School
20th-century British botanists
20th-century British women scientists
Academics of Wye College